Devin Michael Smith (born April 12, 1983) is an American former professional basketball player who last played for Maccabi Tel Aviv of the Israeli Super League. For the 2018–19 NBA season, Smith was a player development coach for the Phoenix Suns.

High school
Smith attended William Penn High School, in New Castle, Delaware, Delaware, where he played high school basketball.

College career
After playing high school basketball, Smith played college basketball at Coffeyville Community College, with the Coffeyville Red Ravens (NJCAA), in the 2001–02 season. He then played at the University of Virginia, with the Virginia Cavaliers (NCAA Division I), from 2002 to 2005.

Professional career

Early years
After going undrafted in the 2005 NBA draft, Smith signed a contract with the Spanish team Bruesa GBC. With them, he won the LEB Oro, the 2nd-tier Spanish League in 2006. He stayed in the club for two seasons, before moving to the Italian team Air Avellino in the summer of 2007. With them, he won the Italian Cup in 2008 and was named the MVP of the Italian Cup.

After breakthrough season, in the summer of 2008, he signed a contract with the Turkish team Fenerbahçe Ülker. With them, he played in the EuroLeague for the first time in his career. Over 14 games in the EuroLeague, he averaged 7.9 points and 3.4 rebounds per game. However, they went short of all the trophies and Smith didn't extend his contract with the team.

In 2010, he signed with the Greek team Panellinios where he stayed for one season.

Benetton Treviso
On July 22, 2010, Smith signed a one-year deal with Italian team Benetton Treviso. Over the season, he averaged 15.1 points and 5.1 rebounds per game in the EuroCup, and 13.7 points and 4.8 rebounds in the Italian League. He was also named to the All-EuroCup First Team for the performances he showed over the season. This was his second consecutive nomination, after also being selected the season before while playing for Panellinios.

Maccabi Tel Aviv
On June 23, 2011, Smith signed a two-year deal with the Israeli team Maccabi Tel Aviv.

On April 1, 2013, he was named the EuroLeague MVP of the month of March, his first such monthly award. Over the month, he helped his team win 4 straight games after having 2–5 score in its Top 16 group. He averaged 15.3 points, 6.5 rebounds and 2 steals per game. He had statistically the best season since coming in the club, having the averages of 11.5 points, 4 rebounds and 1.6 assists over 25 EuroLeague games played. Maccabi however went short of all the trophies.

On June 26, 2013, he signed a new two-year contract with Maccabi. With the first half of the season ended, team's performances showed very little hope that the season would be better than the previous. However, Maccabi finished the season by winning the triple crown. Maccabi eventually won its sixth EuroLeague championship, Smith's first, by defeating Real Madrid in an overtime 98–86 finals game. Smith was one of the key Maccabi players, averaging 9.9 points and career-high 5.6 rebounds with career-high shooting percentages.

In the summer of 2014, Maccabi's roster changed dramatically with the departure of head coach David Blatt, and some key players from the previous season like David Blu, Tyrese Rice, Ricky Hickman and Joe Ingles. His role in the team as being one of the best and most experienced players was left unchanged, as he had many touches. He was named the EuroLeague MVP of the month of December, his second monthly MVP award. Over the month of December, he averaged 20.7 points, 6.7 rebounds, 4 assists and 2 steals per game. Maccabi was eventually stopped in the quarter-final series, after being swept by Fenerbahçe Ülker. In May 2015, he was chosen to the All-EuroLeague Second Team for the performances he put up over the season. He had his best season since coming into the club, averaging all career-highs of 15 points, 6.1 rebounds, 2.5 assists, and 1 steal, over 25 games in the EuroLeague.

On April 7, 2015, he signed a new three-year contract with Maccabi.

On September 27, 2017, after 6 seasons with Maccabi, Smith announced his retirement from playing professional basketball.

Coaching career
On June 11, 2018, Smith would join Jason Staudt as new assistant coaches for the Phoenix Suns under new head coach Igor Kokoškov's staff. However, after putting up a 19–63 record with the Suns, Smith was fired alongside the rest of the team's coaching staff on April 23, 2019.

Career statistics

EuroLeague

|-
| style="text-align:left;"| 2008–09
| style="text-align:left;"|  Fenerbahçe
| 14 || 3 || 24.5 || .411 || .234 || .667 || 3.4 || 1.0 || .5 || .6 || 7.9 || 5.6
|-
| style="text-align:left;"| 2011–12
| style="text-align:left;" rowspan=6|  Maccabi
| 21 || 19 || 27.0 || .419 || .286 || .857 || 4.8 || .8 || .6 || .6 || 8.3 || 8.6
|-
| style="text-align:left;"| 2012–13
| 25 || 24 || 28.5 || .436 || .377 || .844 || 4.0 || 1.6 || .7 || .7 || 11.5 || 10.5
|-
| style="text-align:left;background:#AFE6BA;"| 2013–14†
| 28 || 27 || 28.0 || .498 || .411 || .853 || 5.6 || 1.0 || .5 || .5 || 9.9 || 10.8
|-
| style="text-align:left;"| 2014–15
| 25 || 25 || 31.8 || .458 || .376 || .833 || 6.1 || 2.5 || 1.0 || .6 || 15.0 || 16.1
|-
| style="text-align:left;"| 2015–16
| 9 || 9 || 30.1 || .420 || .413 || .750 || 5.4 || 1.9 || .6 || .1 || 12.7 || 11.1
|-
| style="text-align:left;"| 2016–17
| 28 || 24 || 26.1 || .455 || .352 || .958 || 5.4 || 1.6 || .6 || .4 || 9.2 || 9.1
|- class="sortbottom"
| style="text-align:center;" colspan=2 | Career
| 150 || 131 || 28.0 || .440 || .359 || .833 || 5.1 || 1.5 || .7 || .5 || 10.6 || 10.6

Domestic leagues 

Source: RealGM

Personal
Smith's wife is Danielle Greene, with whom he has 2 daughters.

References

External links

 Devin Smith at acb.com 
 Devin Smith at esake.gr 
 Devin Smith at euroleague.net
 Devin Smith at fibaeurope.com
 Devin Smith at leagabasket.it 
 Devin Smith at sports-reference.com

1983 births
Living people
ABA League players
American expatriate basketball people in Greece
American expatriate basketball people in Israel
American expatriate basketball people in Italy
American expatriate basketball people in Spain
American expatriate basketball people in Turkey
American men's basketball players
Basketball players from Delaware
Coffeyville Red Ravens men's basketball players
Fenerbahçe men's basketball players
Gipuzkoa Basket players
Greek Basket League players
Israeli Basketball Premier League players
Lega Basket Serie A players
Liga ACB players
Maccabi Tel Aviv B.C. players
Panellinios B.C. players
Pallacanestro Treviso players
People from New Castle, Delaware
Phoenix Suns assistant coaches
Power forwards (basketball)
S.S. Felice Scandone players
Shooting guards
Small forwards
Sportspeople from the Delaware Valley
Virginia Cavaliers men's basketball players